From the 16th to the 17th centuries, the First French colonial empire, at its peak in 1680, stretched over a total area of over 10,000,000 km2 (3,900,000 sq mi), the second largest empire in the world at the time behind only the Spanish Empire. During the 19th and 20th centuries, the French colonial empire was the second largest colonial empire in the world only behind the British Empire; it extended over 13,500,000 km2 (5,200,000 sq mi) of land at its height in the 1920s and 1930s. In terms of population however, on the eve of World War II, France and her colonial possessions totaled only 150 million inhabitants, compared with 330 million for British India alone. The total area of ​​the French colonial empires combined (the first mainly in the Americas and Asia, and the second mainly in Africa and Asia) reached , the second largest in the world (after the British Empire). 

This is a list of all territories that were part of the French colonial empires in the last 500 years, either entirely or in part, either under French sovereignty or as mandate or protectorate. When only a part of the country was under French rule, that part is listed in parentheses after the country. When there are no parentheses, it means the whole country was formerly part of any one of the French colonial empires. Countries listed are those where French sovereignty applied effectively. Areas that were only claimed, but not effectively controlled (such as Manhattan or Western Australia) are not listed.

N.B.
"1st" means the country/territory was part of the first French colonial empire.
"2nd" means the country/territory was part of the second French colonial empire.
"Now" means this is a territory still part of the French Republic today.

The Americas

North America

Canada (most of eastern and central Canada, see Acadia and Canada, New France) -- 1st
Saint-Pierre and Miquelon—1st, 2nd, & now
United States (entire basin of the Mississippi and Missouri rivers, Great Lakes, see Louisiana (New France)) -- 1st

Caribbean
Anguilla (briefly) -- 1st
Antigua and Barbuda (briefly) -- 1st
Dominica—1st
Dominican Republic (briefly) -- 1st
Grenada—1st
Guadeloupe—1st, 2nd, & now
Haiti—1st
Martinique—1st, 2nd, & now
Montserrat (briefly) -- 1st
Saint Martin (northern half only) -- 1st, 2nd, & now
Saint-Barthélemy—1st, 2nd, & now
Saint Lucia—1st
Saint Vincent and the Grenadines—1st
Sint Eustatius (briefly) -- 1st
St Kitts and Nevis (St Kitts, but not Nevis) -- 1st
Trinidad and Tobago (Tobago only) -- 1st
US Virgin Islands (Saint Croix only) -- 1st

South America
Brazil (Rio de Janeiro briefly, and São Luís briefly) -- 1st
(see France Antarctique and France Équinoxiale)
French Guiana—1st, 2nd, & now

Africa

North Africa

West Africa
Benin (as Dahomey) -- 2nd
Burkina Faso (as Upper Volta)-- 2nd
Côte d'Ivoire—2nd
Guinea—2nd
Mali (as French Sudan) -- 2nd
Mauritania—2nd
Niger—2nd
Senegal—1st & 2nd
Togo—2nd

Equatorial Africa
Cameroon (91% of Cameroon) -- 2nd
Central African Republic (as Oubangui-Chari)-- 2nd
Chad—2nd
Democratic Republic of Congo ('Congo-Kinshasa') -- 2nd
Gabon—2nd
Republic of the Congo ('Congo-Brazzaville') -- 2nd

Indian Ocean
Comoros—2nd
Madagascar—2nd
Mauritius—1st
Mayotte - 2nd & now
Réunion—1st, 2nd, & now
Scattered Islands in the Indian Ocean - 2nd & now
Seychelles—1st
Tanzania (Zanzibar, briefly) -- 2nd

Red Sea
Djibouti (as French Somaliland) -- 2nd 
Yemen (Cheikh Saïd peninsula)

Asia

Middle East
Lebanon—2nd
Syria—2nd
Turkey (Sanjak of Alexandretta, now called Hatay Province) -- 2nd

South Asia
India
half of India (see French India)-- 1st
only Pondicherry, Karikal, Yanaon, Mahé, and Chandernagore—2nd

East Asia
China 
Kwang-Chou-Wan leased territory, now the city of Zhanjiang (Guangdong province) -- 2nd
French concessions in Shanghai, Guangzhou, Tianjin, and Hankou—2nd
French sphere of influence recognized by China over the provinces of Yunnan, Guangxi, Hainan, and Guangdong—2nd

South East Asia
Cambodia - 2nd
Laos - 2nd
Vietnam (as Tonkin, Annam, and Cochinchina) - 2nd
Eastern Thailand under French Sphere of Influence - 2nd

Oceania
Clipperton - 2nd & now
New Caledonia—2nd & now
French Polynesia—2nd & now
Vanuatu (condominium shared with the British Empire) -- 2nd
Wallis and Futuna—2nd & now

Antarctic Ocean
French Southern and Antarctic Lands—2nd & now

See also 
 History of France

References 

Former French colonies
New France
French colonial empire